Yllka is an Albanian feminine given name, which means "star". Ylli is the masculine form. People bearing the name Yllka include:

Yllka Berisha (born 1988), Swedish model and singer of Albanian origin
Yllka Gashi (born 1982), Kosovar Albanian actress
Yllka Kuqi (born 1982), Kosovar Albanian singer
Yllka Mujo (born 1953),  Albanian actress

References

Albanian feminine given names